Park Dong-jin (born 10 December 1994) is a South Korean footballer who plays as a forward for FC Seoul.

Club career

Gwangju FC
After graduating Hannam University, Dong-jin joined Gwangju FC.

FC Seoul
He joined FC Seoul for the 2018 season. He changed his position to forward since 2019.

International career 
In 2014, he was selected for South Korea national under-23 football team made his debut at a match against Brazil.

In 2015, he participated in 2015 King's Cup and helped the team win the tournament. In the same year, he participated in 2015 Summer Universiade and scored two goals against Chinese Taipei, leading the team to the silver medal.

In 2016, he joined 2016 AFC U-23 Championship and led the team to 2016 Summer Olympics. He was also played for the tournament.

Honours

International
South Korea U23
 King's Cup: 2015

References

External links 
 
 Park Dong-jin – National Team stats at KFA 
 

1994 births
Living people
South Korean footballers
Gwangju FC players
FC Seoul players
Gimcheon Sangmu FC players
K League 1 players
K League 2 players
South Korea under-23 international footballers
Association football defenders
Association football forwards
Footballers at the 2016 Summer Olympics
Olympic footballers of South Korea
Universiade silver medalists for South Korea
Universiade medalists in football